Joseph Kinsey may refer to:
 Joseph Kinsey (politician)
 Joseph Kinsey (entrepreneur)